Du Siyu (Chinese: 杜思雨; born 8 November 2002 in Anhui) is a Chinese artistic gymnast. She is a 2018 world bronze medalist in the team competition (as an alternate on the Chinese team).

Biography 
She debuted at the senior level at the 2018 Melbourne World Cup, winning gold on uneven bars and bronze on balance beam.

At the 2018 World Artistic Gymnastics Championships in Doha, Qatar, she was the alternate on the Chinese team and was awarded a bronze medal for the team competition.

Competitive history

Senior

References

External links 
 

2002 births
Living people
Chinese female artistic gymnasts
Gymnasts from Anhui